Blues at Sunrise is a blues album by Albert King, recorded live at the Montreux Jazz Festival (July 1, 1973), and released in 1988. Material recorded on the 1973 Montreux festival was also released in his albums Montreux Festival and Blues at Sunset.

Track listing
"Don't Burn Down the Bridge ('Cause You Might Wanna Come Back Across)" (Allen Jones, Carl Wells) – 4:28
"I Believe to My Soul" (Ray Charles) – 4:56
"For the Love of a Woman" (Don Nix) – 3:57
"Blues at Sunrise" (Albert King) – 10:05
"I'll Play the Blues for You" (Jerry Beach) – 6:35
"Little Brother (Make a Way)" (Henry Bush, Allen Jones, Carl Smith) – 5:44
"Roadhouse Blues" (Albert King) – 10:04

Personnel
 Albert King - electric guitar, vocals
 Donald Kinsey - electric guitar
 Rick Watson - tenor saxophone
 Norville Hodges - trumpet
 Wilbur Thompson - trumpet
 James Washington - organ
 Bill Rennie - bass guitar
 Sam King - drums

References

Albert King albums
1973 live albums
Stax Records live albums
Albums recorded at the Montreux Jazz Festival
Live blues albums